opened in Asahikawa, Hokkaidō, Japan in 1982. The exhibits include a recreated tondenhei house as well as farming implements, clothes, and documents drawn from the Museum's 2,500 objects, among them the Prefectural Cultural Property Illustrated Tales of the Tondenhei - Tondenhei emaki.

See also
 List of Cultural Properties of Japan - historical materials (Hokkaidō)
 List of Historic Sites of Japan (Hokkaidō)
 Historical Village of Hokkaido
 Hokkaido Museum
 Asahikawa Museum of Sculpture

References

External links
  Asahikawa Tondenhei Village Museum
  Asahikawa Tondenhei Village Museum

Museums in Asahikawa
History of Hokkaido
Museums established in 1982
1982 establishments in Japan